The NCHA Triple Crown comprises three major cutting horse aged events beginning with the NCHA Futurity for 3-year-olds, followed by the NCHA Derby for 4-year-olds, and NCHA Super Stakes for 5-year-olds. All three events are held at the Will Rogers Coliseum in Ft. Worth, Texas. The culmination of prize money for all three events in 2008 was in excess of $10 Million, surpassing that of the Triple Crown of Thoroughbred Racing.

There have been only 3 NCHA Open Division Triple Crown winners and 1 NCHA NonPro Division Triple Crown winner since the inception of the NCHA in 1946: 
Smart Little Lena ridden by Bill Freeman (1982-1983) Open Division
Docs Okie Quixote ridden by Joe Heim (1983-1984) Open Division
Chiquita Pistol ridden by Tag Rice (2002-2003) Open Division 
Watch Me Whip ridden by Armando Costa Neto (2015-2016) NonPro Division

References

External links
 Armando Costa Neto Makes Historic Win in Non Pro Derby Final of 2016 NCHA Summer Spectacular, Video West, August 7, 2016

National Cutting Horse Association